The Hawaiian Pro is a surfing event held annually at Haleiwa, on the North Shore of Oahu, Hawaii. It is currently the first leg of the Triple Crown of Surfing.

References

External links
 

Surfing competitions in Hawaii
Surfing in Hawaii
Annual events in Hawaii
Honolulu County, Hawaii